107 Aquarii (abbreviated 107 Aqr) is a double star in the equatorial constellation of Aquarius. 107 Aquarii is the Flamsteed designation, although it also bears the Bayer designation i2 Aquarii. The pair have an angular separation of 6.787 arcseconds. They have a combined apparent visual magnitude of +5.305, with individual magnitudes of 5.72 and 6.72.

References

External links
 Aladin previewer, image
 Image 107 Aquarii
 Aladin sky atlas, image

Aquarii, i2
Aquarii, 107
223024
117218
9002
Aquarius (constellation)
Double stars
F-type main-sequence stars
F-type giants
Durchmusterung objects